Pungdeng-E is a South Korean female music trio formed in December 2013. One of their original concepts was the use of different regional Korean dialects where each member uses her own local dialect. They are known to have unique lyrics and videos. The members modeled together for the Korean cosmetics brand Seed & Tree.
Pungdeng-E performed on the first and third day of the 42nd Los Angeles Korean Festival in California on November 2, 2015. The groups first Japanese performance was on November 28, 2015 in Ōta, Tokyo.

Discography

Extended plays

Singles 
  (2013)
  (2013)
  (2014)
  (2014)
  (2015)
  (2015)
  (2016)
 Stay (2017)
  (2018)
  (2018)
  (2018)
 Sparkling (2018, with New Town Boyz)
 Super Market (2018)
 Nice Shot (2019)

References 

South Korean hip hop groups
South Korean dance music groups
South Korean girl groups